Thomas Brezzo (born 27 September 1979) is a Monegasque lawyer and politician. He is a member of the National Council of Monaco and President of the Legislation Commission since February 2018.

Life 
Thomas Brezzo was born on 27 September 1979. He obtained Master of Private Law and Criminal Sciences at University of Nice Sophia Antipolis in 2004, and Master II Research – Criminal Law at UFR Aix-En-Provence in 2005. In 2010, Brezzo created and headed a legal consultancy firm “Monaco Legal Consulting”, and in 2016, he was admitted to the Monaco Bar. Among Brezzo's extra-professional activities are kick-boxing, automobiles and underwater exploration. He is engaged in combat sports associations for over 15 years. Brezzo is a vice-president of the International Academy of Kick-Boxing, Muaythai and Krav-Maga, secretary general of the Monegasque Kick-Boxing and Krav Maga Federation, Member of the Commissaries Corps of the Automobile Club of Monaco, and Member of the club of Monaco Underwater Exploration (CESMM).

He is married and has two children.

Career 
In February 2018, he was elected as a member of the National Council of Monaco from the political group Priority Monaco (Primo!). Brezzo was appointed the President of the Legislation Commission. In January 2019, he created a partnership with Thomas Giaccardi and joined his firm. In July 2020, Brezzo drafted a law on judiciary aimed to strengthen its independence guaranteed by the Constitution of 1962. During his presidency in the Legislation Commission, he also was Rapporteur of Law No. 1.462 strengthening the Anti-Money Laundering, Financing on Terrorism and Corruption Mechanism (transcribing the (EU) 4th AML Directive) and of Law No. 1.464 strengthening the protection of persons against defamation and insult.

Brezzo is an Alternate Member of the Monaco Delegation in Organization for Security and Co-operation in Europe Parliamentary Assembly (OSCEPA).

References 

1979 births
Members of the National Council (Monaco)
Priorité Monaco politicians
Monegasque lawyers
Living people